Engle is a surname. Notable people with the surname include:

Addie C. Strong Engle (1845–1926), American writer and publisher
Clair Engle (1911–1964), American politicianfrom California
Claude Engle, American engineer and lecturer
Stephen Decatur Engle (born 1837), American inventor and clockmaker
Claude L'Engle (1868–1919), American politician from Florida
Clyde Engle (1884–1939), American baseball player and coach
Dave Engle (born 1956), American baseball player
Frank L. Engle (1916-2002), American sculptor
Jacob Engle (1753–1854), River Brethren leader
Joe Engle (born 1932), American astronaut
Joel Engle, American musician
Karen Engle, American lawyer
Kerstin Engle (born 1947), Swedish politician
Lavinia Engle (1892–1979), American suffragette and politician
Madeleine L'Engle (1918–2007), American author of children's books
Paul Engle (1908–1991), American poet and author
Randall Engle, American psychologist
Rip Engle (1906–1983), American college football coach
Robert F. Engle (born 1942), American economist, Nobel prize winner
Vanessa Engle (born c. 1962), British documentary filmmaker

See also
Margie Goldstein-Engle (born 1958), American equestrian